Pilodeudorix diyllus, the green-streaked playboy, is a butterfly in the family Lycaenidae. It is found in Senegal, the Gambia, Guinea, Sierra Leone, Liberia, Ivory Coast, Ghana, Togo, Nigeria and Cameroon. The habitat consists of forests.

Adults have been recorded feeding from the flowers of Eupatorium odorata.

The larvae feed on Pterocarpus esculenta. They are attended by ants of the genus Oecophylla.

Subspecies
Pilodeudorix diyllus diyllus (Guinea, Sierra Leone, Liberia, Ivory Coast, Ghana, Togo, Nigeria: south and the Cross River loop, western Cameroon)
Pilodeudorix diyllus occidentalis Libert, 2004 (Senegal, Gambia, Guinea)

References

External links
Die Gross-Schmetterlinge der Erde 13: Die Afrikanischen Tagfalter. Plate XIII 66 a

Butterflies described in 1878
Deudorigini
Butterflies of Africa
Taxa named by William Chapman Hewitson